Tulsi Manas Mandir (Hindi: तुलसी मानस मंदिर) is one of the most famous temples in the holy city of Varanasi. This temple has great historical and cultural importance in Hinduism since the ancient Hindu epic Ramcharitmanas was originally written at this place by Hindu poet-saint, reformer and philosopher Goswami Tulsidas in the 16th century (c. 1532–1623).

History
One of the famous Hindu epics, Ramayan was originally written in Sanskrit language by Sanskrit poet Valmiki between 500 and 100 BC. Being in Sanskrit language, this epic was not accessible to and understood by masses. In the 16th century, Goswami Tulsidas wrote the Ramayan in Awadhi dialect of Hindi language and the Awadhi version was called Ramcharitmanas (meaning Lake of the deeds of Rama).

In 1964, the Sureka family constructed a temple at the same place where Goswami Tulsidas wrote Ramcharitmanas.

Construction

Construction finished in 1964 and was funded by the Thakur Das Sureka family of Bandhaghat, Howrah, West Bengal. The temple was constructed in white marble and landscaping all around the temple. Verses and scenes (pictorials) from Ramcharitmanas are engraved on the marble walls all over the temple.

Location
Tulsi Manas Mandir is situated on the Sankat Mochan road, 250 meters south of Durga Kund, 700 meters north-east of Sankat Mochan Mandir and 1.3 kilometers north of Banaras Hindu University.

Historical importance

Due to Ramcharitmanas, the epic Ramayan was read by larger number of people, who otherwise could not have read Ramayan since it was in Sanskrit. Reportedly, prior to Ramcharitmanas, Lord Ram was depicted as a great King and it was Ramcharitmanas which bestowed him as a Deity. The temple was inaugurated by HH Dr. Sarvapalli Radhakrishanan. The temple houses a museum with rare collection of manuscripts and artifacts.

See also
Durga Mandir
Hindu temples in Varanasi

References

External links
Why Tulsi Manas Mandir is importance for us || History of Tulsi Manas Temple

Hindu temples in Varanasi